L'Appel (The Calling) was a collaborationist periodical of Vichy France.  It was the organ of the collaborationist  French League and edited by the League's leader, Pierre Costantini of the Parti populaire français (PPF). The paper was established in 1940. Its two main contributors were Robert Julien-Courtine (1910-1998) and Paul Riche, the latter being a pseudonym of Jean Mamy. Mamy was condemned to death executed for treason and executed at the fortress of Montrouge on 29 March 1949.

References

1940 establishments in France
Defunct newspapers published in France
French-language newspapers
French collaboration during World War II
Newspapers of the Vichy regime
Publications with year of disestablishment missing
Newspapers established in 1940